Running On Climate is a feature documentary by Robert Alstead and Joanna Clarke of icycle.ca productions Ltd. The film focuses on the election campaign in 2013 of climate scientist Andrew J. Weaver as the first Green Party Member of the Legislative Assembly in British Columbia, Canada.

Running on Climate premiered at the DOXA Documentary Film Festival in Vancouver in May 2015.

External links
 On Reelhouse

2015 films
Canadian documentary films
2015 documentary films
Documentary films about global warming
2010s Canadian films